Legousia speculum-veneris, the looking glass or large Venus's-looking-glass, is an annual ornamental plant in the family Campanulaceae (bellflowers). It blooms from June to August and is native to the Mediterranean region.

Synonyms
 Campanula speculum-veneris      
 Legousia arvensis               
 Prismatocarpus speculum-veneris 
 Campanula pulchella             
 Legousia durandei               
 Campanula arvensis              
 Prismatocarpus hirtus           
 Campanula hirta                 
 Campanula cordata               
 Specularia speculum             
 Specularia speculum-veneris     
 Legousia speculum               
 Specularia speculum-veneris var. calycina     
 Specularia speculum-veneris var. libanotica   
 Specularia speculum-veneris var. pubescens    
 Prismatocarpus cordatus                           
 Specularia cordata                                 
 Specularia vulgaris                                
 Prismatocarpus speculum-veneris var. hirtus   
 Specularia speculum-veneris var. stricta      
 Specularia arvensis                               
 Campanula trigona                                 
 Specularia speculum-veneris var. racemosa     
 Specularia speculum-veneris var. cordata      
 Specularia speculum-veneris var. hirta        
 Specularia speculum-veneris subsp. hirta      
 Specularia speculum-veneris f. plena          
 Specularia speculum-veneris f. procumbens     
 Specularia speculum-veneris var. procumbens   
 Specularia speculum-veneris subvar. pubescens 
 Specularia polypiflora                            
 Specularia hirta                                  
 Legousia speculum-veneris f. calycina         
 Legousia speculum-veneris f. polypiflora      
 Legousia speculum-veneris f. stricta          
 Githopsis latifolia

References

 Dominique Villars, Histoire des Plantes de Dauphiné  2: 338 (1786).

External links
USDA Plants Profile: Legousia speculum-veneris

Campanuloideae
Flora of Europe
Flora of Serbia
Plants described in 1753
Taxa named by Carl Linnaeus